Denis Vasilyevich Ilescu (born 20 January 1987) is a Moldovan footballer.

Career
Ilescu started his career at football academy found by Igor Dobrovolski in Chişinău. In 2006–07 season he played for Academia UTM Chişinău which also owned by Dobrovolski at Moldovan "A" Division, in although the league is semi-professional, he was signed by FC Kryvbas Kryvyi Rih that season. He played once in Ukrainian Premier League before left for Russian Premier League side FC Saturn Moscow Oblast.

In 2008 season he left for Anzhi Makhachkala of Russian First Division on loan. But in June 2008 the loan was terminated early. In January 2009, he was putted to transfer market by Saturn.

In March 2009, he returned to Academia In the 2009–10 season, he scored a goal on 2 August 2009 against FC Zimbru Chişinău. The match ended in a 2–2 draw.

In January 2010, he followed Igor Dobrovolski to Dacia Chişinău on trial. Dobrovolski was trained with Dacia and is negotiating a coaching contract.

International career
Ilescu was call-up to Moldova U21 He played one match at 2009 UEFA European Under-21 Football Championship qualification. On 6 February 2008, he made his senior debut against Kazakhstan, substituted Alexandru Gaţcan in the 82nd minute. The team was coached by Igor Dobrovolski.

References

Moldovan footballers
Moldovan expatriate footballers
Moldova international footballers
Expatriate footballers in Russia
FC Kryvbas Kryvyi Rih players
Moldovan expatriate sportspeople in Kazakhstan
Expatriate footballers in Ukraine
Moldovan expatriate sportspeople in Ukraine
Association football defenders
1987 births
Living people
Expatriate footballers in Kazakhstan
FC Astana players
Ukrainian Premier League players
FC Saturn Ramenskoye players
FC Anzhi Makhachkala players